Tameka Yallop ( Butt; born 16 June 1991) is an Australian professional soccer midfielder who plays for Brann in the Norwegian Toppserien. She previously played for the Boston Breakers in the WPSL Elite, German Frauen-Bundesliga club 1. FFC Frankfurt, Japanese Nadeshiko League club Iga F.C. Kunoichi, Swedish Damallsvenskan club Mallbackens, Brisbane Roar in the Australian W-League, West Ham United in the FA Women's Super League, and has been a member of the Australian national team since 2007.

Club career

Brisbane Roar, 2008–2018
Yallop joined the Brisbane Roar (then the Queensland Roar) in 2008, as they were one of the founding members of the W-League. They won the W-League Championship and Premiership in 2008–09. In the 2010–11 season, Brisbane returned to the Grand Final, where Yallop scored a goal in the 9th minute, helping the team to a 2–1 victory.

She briefly played with the Ottawa Fury in 2010.

Yallop won the Westfield W-League Players Player of the Year Award for the 2012–13 season. She was the recipient of the Julie Dolan Medal for W-League Player of the year in 2014.

As of February 2018, Yallop ranks 5th in all-time W-League history with 108 appearances and ranks 3rd in goals with 49.

Boston Breakers, 2012
Yallop signed with the Boston Breakers in the Women's Premier Soccer League Elite (WPSL Elite), the top division of women's soccer in the United States at the time, for the 2012 season.

FFC Frankfurt, 2013–2014
In January 2013, Yallop signed for German Frauen-Bundesliga club 1. FFC Frankfurt.

Iga F.C. Kunoichi, 2014
Yallop was loaned by Brisbane Roar to Iga F.C. Kunoichi along with Elise Kellond-Knight in late May 2014, and returned to Brisbane Roar for the 7th W-League season.

Mallbackens IF, 2016
In March 2016, Yallop signed for Swedish club Mallbackens.

Klepp IL, 2017–2018
In March 2017, Yallop signed for Norwegian club Klepp.

Melbourne City, 2018–2019 
After spending ten seasons with the Brisbane Roar, Yallop signed with Melbourne City for the 2018–19 W-League season.

Brisbane Roar, 2019–2021
In October 2019, the Brisbane Roar announced that Yallop would be returning to Brisbane for the 2019–20 W-League season, where she scored in their first game of the season. On 5 December, Tameka became the first Brisbane Roar player (including men, women and youth) to score 50 goals for the club.

West Ham United, 2021–2022
In May 2021, Yallop joined English club West Ham United. Playing 16 games with 1 goal in the FAWSL, 3 games in Women's FA Cup and 3 games in FA Women's League Cup. In August 2022, she left the club by mutual consent.

Brann, 2022–
In August 2022, Yallop joined Norwegian club Brann on a one-year contract with a further six months option.

International career

Yallop has represented the Young Matildas at various age levels. She was a member of the 2007 AFC Women's U-17 Asian Championship team and  2008 AFC Women's U-20s Women's Asian Championship team. Yallop captained the Australian U-20s National Team from 2007 to 2009 which included winning the 2008 AFF Women's Championship.

Yallop has been a member of the Australia women's national soccer team since 2007. She was part of the team that won the 2010 AFC Women's Asian Cup. Yallop played for Australia at the 2011 FIFA Women's World Cup and the 2015 FIFA Women's World Cup. Australia lost in the quarter-finals in 2011 and 2015.

In 2016, Yallop was named to her first Olympic Team for Rio 2016. Australia lost in the quarter-finals and Yallop did not appear in any games.

At the 2017 Tournament of Nations Yallop scored the only goal in a 1–0 win over the United States. This was the first time Australia had ever defeated the United States. The Matildas won the 2017 Tournament of Nations

At the 2018 AFC Women's Asian Cup Yallop appeared in three games for Australia. The Matildas advanced to the Final where they lost 1–0 to Japan. Australia qualified for the 2019 FIFA Women's World Cup.

Yallop was a member of the Matildas Tokyo 2020 Olympics squad. The Matildas qualified for the quarter-finals and beat Great Britain before being eliminated in the semi-final with Sweden. In the playoff for the Bronze medal they were beaten by the USA.

Career statistics

International goals

Personal life
In December 2017, Yallop announced her engagement to her Klepp IL teammate Kirsty Yallop on her Twitter account. The two were married in Mangawhai, New Zealand, on 9 February 2019. Following the marriage they both took on the surname Yallop.

Honours
Brisbane Roar
 W-League Premiership: 2008–09, 2012–13, 2017–18
 W-League Championship: 2008–09, 2010–11

Australia
 AFC Women's Asian Cup: 2010
 AFF Women's Championship: 2008
 AFC Olympic Qualifying Tournament: 2016
 Tournament of Nations: 2017
 FFA Cup of Nations: 2019

Individual
 Julie Dolan Medal: 2013–14

References

External links

 
 Brisbane Roar player profile 
 Boston Breakers player profile
 

Australian women's soccer players
Living people
1991 births
2011 FIFA Women's World Cup players
2015 FIFA Women's World Cup players
Footballers at the 2016 Summer Olympics
Brisbane Roar FC (A-League Women) players
Melbourne City FC (A-League Women) players
Boston Breakers players
1. FFC Frankfurt players
Iga FC Kunoichi players
Mallbackens IF players
West Ham United F.C. Women players
Sportswomen from New South Wales
Soccer players from New South Wales
A-League Women players
Women's Premier Soccer League Elite players
Nadeshiko League players
Damallsvenskan players
Australia women's international soccer players
Expatriate women's footballers in Germany
Expatriate women's soccer players in the United States
Expatriate women's footballers in Japan
Expatriate women's footballers in Sweden
Australian expatriate sportspeople in Germany
Australian expatriate sportspeople in Sweden
Australian expatriate women's soccer players
Australian expatriate sportspeople in the United States
Australian expatriate sportspeople in Japan
Women's association football midfielders
Olympic soccer players of Australia
2019 FIFA Women's World Cup players
Klepp IL players
Footballers at the 2020 Summer Olympics
FIFA Century Club
Australian expatriate sportspeople in Norway
Expatriate women's footballers in Norway
Toppserien players
SK Brann Kvinner players
Australian expatriate sportspeople in England
Expatriate women's footballers in England
Australian LGBT soccer players
Lesbian sportswomen
Ottawa Fury (women) players
Expatriate women's soccer players in Canada
Australian expatriate sportspeople in Canada
USL W-League (1995–2015) players